Oleksandr Dolgopolov Jr., who received a special exempt into the main draw, became the first champion of this tournament. He defeated 3rd-seeded Pablo Andújar 6–4, 6–2 in the final.

Seeds

Draw

Final four

Top half

Bottom half

References
 Main Draw
 Qualifying Draw

Trofeo Bellaveglia - Singles
Orbetello Challenger